Pohořelice may refer to places in the Czech Republic:

Pohořelice, a town in the South Moravian Region
Pohořelice (Zlín District), a municipality and village in the Zlín Region
Pohořelice, a hamlet and part of Nadějkov in the South Bohemian Region